The Big Smoke may refer to:

London, England
Big Smoke Burger, an international restaurant chain based in Toronto, Ontario, Canada
Jack Johnson (boxer), referred to as "Big Smoke"
"The Big Smoke", a book about Johnson by Adrian Matejka
Melvin "Big Smoke" Harris, a supporting character in Grand Theft Auto: San Andreas
The Big Smoke (publication), an Australian opinion site, also with an American version
The Big Smoke (novel), a 1959 novel by Australian writer D'Arcy Niland